Khalij-e-Fars Stadium in Bandar Abbas, Hormozgan, Iran was opened in 2010, and is the current home to Shahrdari Bandarabbas  F.C.

References

Football venues in Iran
Buildings and structures in Hormozgan Province
Bandar Abbas